Prince Grigory Vasilyevich Kugushev (17 March 1824 – 3 October 1871) was a Russian writer, poet and playwright whose comedies, including Goluboi Kapot (Blue Hood), Pari (The Bet), Priyomysh (The Foster) had considerable, if not lasting, success in the Russian Imperial Theatres in 1850s. More substantial and critically acclaimed were Kugushev's works of fiction, notably Kornet Otletayev (Корнет Отлетаев, a three-part novella, first published by Russky Vestnik in 1856) and the four-part novel Postoronneye Vliyaniye (Постороннее влияние, The Outside Influence, 1858—1859). He also wrote the libretto for the epic drama opera Mazeppa (1859) by Baron 
Boris Fitinhof-Schell.

References 

Russian dramatists and playwrights
Writers from the Russian Empire
Russian librettists
1824 births
1871 deaths